Liza Echeverría (born Linda Elizabeth Echeverría Gray on August 29, 1972 in Mexico City, Distrito Federal, Mexico) is a Mexican actress, model and television presenter.

Telenovelas
 Luz Clarita (1996) as Dana
 Misión S.O.S. (2004) as Sirena

As a host
 Galardón a los grandes (1989)
 TVo (1991)
 Bailando por un sueño (2005)
 Cantando por un sueño (2006)

As a guest
 Hoy 14 July 2004
 100 mexicanos dijeron episode "Conductoras vs Conductores" (episode # 1.5) 15 August 2004

External links
 
 Biography at miescuelita.org

1972 births
Living people
Mexican female models
Mexican television presenters
Mexican telenovela actresses
Actresses from Mexico City
Mexican people of Basque descent
Mexican women television presenters